In mathematics and theoretical physics, a representation of a Lie group is a linear action of a Lie group on a vector space. Equivalently, a representation is a smooth homomorphism of the group into the group of invertible operators on the vector space. Representations play an important role in the study of continuous symmetry. A great deal is known about such representations, a basic tool in their study being the use of the corresponding 'infinitesimal' representations of Lie algebras.

Finite-dimensional representations

Representations

A complex representation of a group is an action by a group on a finite-dimensional vector space over the field .
,
where  is the general linear group of all invertible linear transformations of  under their composition. Since all n-dimensional spaces are isomorphic, the group  can be identified with the group of the invertible, complex  generally  Smoothness of the map  can be regarded as a technicality, in that any  continuous homomorphism will automatically be smooth.

A typical example in which representations arise in physics would be the study of a linear partial differential equation having symmetry group . See the example of SO(3), discussed below.

Basic definitions
If the homomorphism  is injective (i.e., a monomorphism), the representation is said to be faithful.

If a basis for the complex vector space V is chosen, the representation can be expressed as a homomorphism into general linear group . This is known as a matrix representation. Two representations of G on vector spaces V, W are equivalent if they have the same matrix representations with respect to some choices of bases 
for V and W.

The representation is said to be irreducible if the only invariant subspaces of V are the zero space and V itself. For certain types of Lie groups, namely compact and semisimple groups, every finite-dimensional representation decomposes as a direct sum of irreducible representations, a property known as complete reducibility. For such groups, a typical goal of representation theory is to classify all finite-dimensional irreducible representations of the given group, up to isomorphism. (See the Classification section below.)

A unitary representation on a finite-dimensional inner product space is defined in the same way, except that  is required to map into the group of unitary operators. If G is a compact Lie group, every finite-dimensional representation is equivalent to a unitary one.

Lie algebra representations
Each representation of a Lie group G gives rise to a representation of its Lie algebra; this correspondence is discussed in detail in subsequent sections. See representation of Lie algebras for the Lie algebra theory.

An example: The rotation group SO(3)

In quantum mechanics, the time-independent Schrödinger equation,  plays an important role. In the three-dimensional case, if  has rotational symmetry, then the space  of solutions to  will be invariant under the action of SO(3). Thus,  will—for each fixed value of —constitute a representation of SO(3), which is typically finite dimensional. In trying to solve , it helps to know what all possible finite-dimensional representations of SO(3) look like. The representation theory of SO(3) plays a key role, for example, in the mathematical analysis of the hydrogen atom.

Every standard textbook on quantum mechanics contains an analysis which essentially classifies finite-dimensional irreducible representations of SO(3), by means of its Lie algebra. (The commutation relations among the angular momentum operators are just the relations for the Lie algebra  of SO(3).) One subtlety of this analysis is that the representations of the group and the Lie algebra are not in one-to-one correspondence, a point that is critical in understanding the distinction between integer spin and half-integer spin.

Ordinary representations
The rotation group SO(3) is a compact Lie group and thus every finite-dimensional representation of SO(3) decomposes as a direct sum of irreducible representations. The group SO(3) has one irreducible representation in each odd dimension.

As noted above, the finite-dimensional representations of SO(3) arise naturally when studying the time-independent Schrödinger equation for a radial potential, such as the hydrogen atom, as a reflection of the rotational symmetry of the problem. (See the role played by the spherical harmonics in the mathematical analysis of hydrogen.)

Projective representations
If we look at the Lie algebra  of SO(3), this Lie algebra is isomorphic to the Lie algebra  of SU(2). The even-dimensional representations, however, do not correspond to representations of the group SO(3). These so-called "fractional spin" representations do, however, correspond to projective representations of SO(3). These representations arise in the quantum mechanics of particles with fractional spin, such as an electron.

Operations on representations
In this section, we describe three basic operations on representations. See also the corresponding constructions for representations of a Lie algebra.

Direct sums

Certain types of Lie groups—notably, compact Lie groups—have the property that every finite-dimensional representation is isomorphic to a direct sum of irreducible representations. In such cases, the classification of representations reduces to the classification of irreducible representations. See Weyl's theorem on complete reducibility.

Tensor products of representations

That is to say, .

The Lie algebra representation  associated to the tensor product representation  is given by the formula:

The tensor product of two irreducible representations is usually not irreducible; a basic problem in representation theory is then to decompose tensor products of irreducible representations as a direct sum of irreducible subspaces. This problem goes under the name of "addition of angular momentum" or "Clebsch–Gordan theory" in the physics literature.

Dual representations

Then we can define a representation  by the formula

where for any operator , the transpose operator  is defined as the "composition with " operator:

The dual of an irreducible representation is always irreducible, but may or may not be isomorphic to the original representation. In the case of the group SU(3), for example, the irreducible representations are labeled by a pair  of non-negative integers.

Lie group versus Lie algebra representations

Overview
In many cases, it is convenient to study representations of a Lie group by studying representations of the associated Lie algebra. In general, however, not every representation of the Lie algebra comes from a representation of the group. This fact is, for example, lying behind the distinction between integer spin and half-integer spin in quantum mechanics. On the other hand, if G is a simply connected group, then a theorem says that we do, in fact, get a one-to-one correspondence between the group and Lie algebra representations.

Roughly speaking, this is effected by taking the matrix exponential of the matrices of the Lie algebra representation. A subtlety arises if  is not simply connected.

These results will be explained more fully below.

The Lie correspondence gives results only for the connected component of the groups, and thus the other components of the full group are treated separately by giving representatives for matrices representing these components, one for each component. For example, in the case of the four-component Lorentz group, representatives of space inversion and time reversal must be put in by hand. Further illustrations will be drawn from the representation theory of the Lorentz group below.

The exponential mapping

If  is a matrix Lie group, the expression  can be computed by the usual power series for the exponential. That is, the exponential map has a local inverse. In most groups, this is only local; that is, the exponential map is typically neither one-to-one nor onto.

Lie algebra representations from group representations 
It is always possible to pass from a representation of a Lie group  to a representation of its Lie algebra  If  is a group representation for some vector space , then its pushforward (differential) at the identity, or Lie map,  is a Lie algebra representation. It is explicitly computed using

A basic property relating  and  involves the exponential map:

The question we wish to investigate is whether every representation of  arises in this way from representations of the group . As we shall see, this is the case when  is simply connected.

Group representations from Lie algebra representations 
The main result of this section is the following:
Theorem: If  is simply connected, then every representation  of the Lie algebra  of  comes from a representation  of  itself.
From this we easily deduce the following:
A projective representation is one in which each  is defined only up to multiplication by a constant. In quantum physics, it is natural to allow projective representations in addition to ordinary ones, because states are really defined only up to a constant. (That is to say, if  is a vector in the quantum Hilbert space, then  represents the same physical state for any constant .) In the physics literature, projective representations are often described as multi-valued representations (i.e., each  does not have a single value but a whole family of values). This phenomenon is important to the study of fractional spin in quantum mechanics.

We now outline the proof of the main results above. If there is going to be an associated Lie group representation , it must satisfy the exponential relation of the previous subsection.

A key question is then this: Is this locally defined map a "local homomorphism"? (This question would apply even in the special case where the exponential mapping is globally one-to-one and onto; in that case,  would be a globally defined map, but it is not obvious why  would be a homomorphism.) The answer to this question is yes:  is a local homomorphism, and this can be established using the Baker–Campbell–Hausdorff formula.

Thus, we can tentatively define  globally as follows.

Note, however, that the representation of a given group element as a product of exponentials is very far from unique, so it is very far from clear that  is actually well defined.

To address the question of whether  is well defined, we connect each group element  to the identity using a continuous path. If  is simply connected, any path starting at the identity and ending at  can be continuously deformed into any other such path, showing that  is fully independent of the choice of path. Given that the initial definition of  near the identity was a local homomorphism, it is not difficult to show that the globally defined map is also a homomorphism satisfying .

Let  be the covering map. Thus, if  is irreducible, Schur's lemma implies that the kernel of  will act by scalar multiples of the identity.

A pictorial view of how the universal covering group contains all such homotopy classes, and a technical definition of it (as a set and as a group) is given in geometric view.

Classification in the compact case 

If G is a connected compact Lie group, its finite-dimensional representations can be decomposed as direct sums of irreducible representations. The irreducibles are classified by a "theorem of the highest weight." We give a brief description of this theory here; for more details, see the articles on representation theory of a connected compact Lie group and the parallel theory classifying representations of semisimple Lie algebras.

Let T be a maximal torus in G. By Schur's lemma, the irreducible representations of T are one dimensional. These representations can be classified easily and are labeled by certain "analytically integral elements" or "weights." (The same weight can occur more than once.) For a fixed , one can identify one of the weights as "highest" and the representations are then classified by this highest weight.

An important aspect of the representation theory is the associated theory of characters. Here, for a representation  of G, the character is the function
 
given by

Two representations with the same character turn out to be isomorphic. Furthermore, the Weyl character formula gives a remarkable formula for the character of a representation in terms of its highest weight. Not only does this formula gives a lot of useful information about the representation, but it plays a crucial role in the proof of the theorem of the highest weight.

Unitary representations on Hilbert spaces 
Let V be a complex Hilbert space, which may be infinite dimensional, and let  denote the group of unitary operators on V. A unitary representation of a Lie group G on V is a group homomorphism  with the property that for each fixed , the map
 
is a continuous map of G into V.

Finite-dimensional unitary representations 

Infinite-dimensional unitary representations 
If the Hilbert space V is allowed to be infinite dimensional, the study of unitary representations involves a number of interesting features that are not present in the finite dimensional case. For example, the construction of an appropriate representation of the Lie algebra  becomes technically challenging. One setting in which the Lie algebra representation is well understood is that of semisimple (or reductive) Lie groups, where the associated Lie algebra representation forms a (g,K)-module.

Examples of unitary representations arise in quantum mechanics and quantum field theory, but also in Fourier analysis as shown in the following example. Let , and let the complex Hilbert space V be . We define the representation  by

Here are some important examples in which unitary representations of a Lie group have been analyzed. 
 The Stone–von Neumann theorem can be understood as giving a classification of the irreducible unitary representations of the Heisenberg group. 
 Wigner's classification for representations of the Poincaré group plays a major conceptual role in quantum field theory by showing how the mass and spin of particles can be understood in group-theoretic terms. 
 The representation theory of SL(2,R) was worked out by V. Bargmann and serves as the prototype for the study of unitary representations of noncompact semisimple Lie groups.

Projective representations

In quantum physics, one is often interested in projective unitary representations of a Lie group . The reason for this interest is that states of a quantum system are represented by vectors in a Hilbert space —but with the understanding that two states differing by a constant are actually the same physical state. The symmetries of the Hilbert space are then described by unitary operators, but a unitary operator that is a multiple of the identity does not change the physical state of the system. Thus, we are interested not in ordinary unitary representations—that is, homomorphisms of  into the unitary group —but rather in projective unitary representations—that is, homomorphisms of  into the projective unitary group 

To put it differently, for a projective representation, we construct a family of unitary operators , where it is understood that changing  by a constant of absolute value 1 is counted as "the same" operator. The operators  are then required to satisfy the homomorphism property up to a constant:

We have already discussed the irreducible projective unitary representations of the rotation group SO(3) above; considering projective representations allows for fractional spin in addition to integer spin.

Important examples where Bargmann's theorem applies are SO(3) (as just mentioned) and the Poincaré group. The latter case is important to Wigner's classification of the projective representations of the Poincaré group, with applications to quantum field theory.

One example where Bargmann's theorem does not apply is the group . The set of translations in position and momentum on  form a projective unitary representation of  but they do not come from an ordinary representation of the universal cover of —which is just  itself. (See the discussion here.)

The commutative case

(This claim follows from Schur's lemma and holds even if the representations are not assumed ahead of time to be finite dimensional.) For example, if , the irreducible unitary representations have the form 
,
for some real number .

See also Pontryagin duality for this case.

See also
 Representation theory of connected compact groups
 Lie algebra representation
 Projective representation
 Representation theory of SU(2)
 Representation theory of the Lorentz group
 Representation theory of Hopf algebras
 Adjoint representation of a Lie group
 List of Lie group topics
 Symmetry in quantum mechanics
Wigner D-matrix

Notes

References 
 
 .
 .
 .
 . The 2003 reprint corrects several typographical mistakes.
 

 
Lie groups